Corythucha spinosa is a species of lace bug in the family Tingidae. It is found in the Caribbean, Central America, and North America.

References

Further reading

 
 

Tingidae
Articles created by Qbugbot
Insects described in 1889